Antonio de Sotomayor (died 1648) was a Royal Confessor to the King of Spain who served as Grand Inquisitor of Spain from July 17, 1632, until his resignation on June 21, 1643.

References
Appendix 2 to Henry Charles Lea's A History of the Inquisition of Spain

1648 deaths
Grand Inquisitors of Spain
Year of birth unknown